Handley Jacob Daniel (April 22, 1911 – April 23, 1996) was a professional baseball player. He played in Major League Baseball for the 1937 Brooklyn Dodgers, primarily as a first baseman.

External links

Major League Baseball first basemen
Baseball players from Alabama
People from Roanoke, Alabama
Brooklyn Dodgers players
Birmingham Barons players
Portsmouth Pirates players
Albany Senators players
Elmira Colonels players
Trenton Senators players
Elmira Pioneers players
Syracuse Chiefs players
LaGrange Troupers players
Valley Rebels players
New Bern Bears players
Newnan Brownies players
Tarboro A's players
Burlington Bees (Carolina League) players
Augusta Tigers players
Leesburg Packers players
Vidalia Indians players
1911 births
1996 deaths